Stanley Mark Wood (21 May 1919 – 28 September 2014) was the third Anglican Bishop of Matabeleland and the first Bishop of Ludlow.

Background
Wood was educated at University College, Cardiff. After studying at the College of the Resurrection he was ordained as a deacon in 1942 and as a priest in 1943.  After a curacy at St Mary's Cardiff Docks he served the Anglican Church in Southern Africa for over 30 years. He was curate of Sophiatown Mission, Johannesburg (1945–47); Rector of Bloemhof, Transvaal (1947–50); Priest in Charge of St Cyprian's Mission, Johannesburg (1950–55); Rector of Marandellas, Zimbabwe (1955–65); Dean of Salisbury, Rhodesia (1965–70); Bishop of Matabeleland (1971–77) before returning to England, firstly as an assistant bishop in the Diocese of Hereford and finally as its suffragan bishop. He retired to Surrey in 1987.

References

1919 births
2014 deaths
Alumni of Cardiff University
Alumni of the College of the Resurrection
Bishops of Ludlow
Anglican bishops of Matabeleland
20th-century Anglican bishops in Africa
Deans of Harare
20th-century Church of England bishops